A devolved English parliament is a proposed institution that would give separate decision-making powers to representatives for voters in England, similar to the representation given by the Senedd (Welsh Parliament), the Scottish Parliament and the Northern Ireland Assembly. A devolved English parliament is an issue in the politics of the United Kingdom.

Public opinion surveys have resulted in widely differing conclusions on public support for the establishment of a devolved English parliament.

Background

The future prospects of a devolved English Parliament have been raised in relation to the West Lothian question, which came to the fore after devolutionary changes to British parliaments. Before 1998, all political issues, even when only concerning parts of the United Kingdom, were decided by the British Parliament at Westminster. After separate regional parliaments or assemblies were introduced in Scotland, Wales and Northern Ireland in 1998, issues concerning only these parts of the United Kingdom were often decided by the respective devolved assemblies, while purely English issues were decided by the entire British Parliament, with MPs from Scotland, Wales and Northern Ireland fully participating in debating and voting. The establishment of a devolved English parliament, giving separate decision-making powers to representatives for voters in England, has thus become an issue in British politics.

The political parties which are campaigning for an English Parliament are the English Democrats, and the UK Independence Party (UKIP). Since 1997, the Campaign for an English Parliament (CEP) has been campaigning for a referendum on an English Parliament. Despite institutional opposition in Westminster to a Parliament for England, the CEP has had some success in bringing the issue to people's attention, particularly in political and academic circles.

During general elections, all of the single-member constituencies (seats) that constitute the UK Parliament are subject to separate, simultaneous contests, between several candidates. While these constituencies span the entire UK geographically, because of the way that the population of the UK is distributed – i. e. the population of England is greater than that of Northern Ireland, Scotland and Wales combined – the 533 MPs from English constituencies represent a majority within the House of Commons. Nevertheless, there are often occasions when the votes of MPs from non-English constituencies have proved to be decisive with regard to England-specific legislation (regarding matters that are devolved outside England). (Examples of this phenomenon since devolution include issues with such as foundation hospitals, top-up fees and runways at Heathrow.) To a limited extent, the Scotland Act 1998 has reduced the potential for non-English MPs to form decisive regional blocs – that is, Section 81 of the Act abolished the previous system of apportionment, under which Scottish constituencies required a smaller electoral quota and Scotland was over-represented, relative to the other components of the UK; England now provides more MPs per capita than Scotland.

Surveys of public opinion on the establishment of an English parliament have given widely varying conclusions. In the first five years of devolution for Scotland and Wales, support in England for the establishment of an English parliament was low at between 16 and 19 per cent, according to successive British Social Attitudes Surveys. A report, also based on the British Social Attitudes Survey, published in December 2010 suggests that only 29 per cent of people in England support the establishment of an English parliament, though this figure had risen from 17 per cent in 2007.
One 2007 poll carried out for BBC Newsnight, however, found that 61 per cent would support such a parliament being established.

In January 2012 Simon Hughes, the deputy leader of the Liberal Democrats, supported calls for a devolved English parliament. While the Conservatives were in government from 2010 to 2015 in coalition with the Liberal Democrats, the coalition government approved the creation of the McKay Commission to look into the question. The Commission proposed that bills in the House of Commons which affected England solely or differently should require a majority vote of MPs representing English constituencies, a system known as English votes for English laws (EVEL).

The Labour Party opposed the idea, arguing that this creates two classes of MPs in the House of Commons, and that a regional approach should be taken, in the form of regional English devolution. However, in July 2015, then Shadow Secretary of State for Business, Chuka Umunna, suggested that the Labour Party should support the creation of a separate English parliament as part of a federal United Kingdom. He also called for a federal structure to the Labour Party with the creation of a distinct English Labour Party.

The Conservative Party manifesto for the 2015 general election included a proposal that England-only legislation should require approval from a Legislative Grand Committee prior to its Third Reading in the House of Commons. Having won a majority in that election, the Conservative government used a change in standing orders in October 2015 to give MPs representing English constituencies a "veto" over laws only affecting England. EVEL was scrapped in July 2021.

In October 2021, a poll by Public First found that 62% of English voters would vote for an English Parliament. Furthermore, an even bigger majority of 'English identifiers' – 72% – want laws that only apply in England to be made by MPs elected in England, whilst 64% of all English voters, including 'British identifiers', thought the same.

Campaigning

Several groups are working to raise this issue of a devolved English parliament, including the Campaign for an English Parliament and the English Constitutional Convention. The English Democrats also support the creation of an English parliament. Electoral support for English nationalist parties is low, however, even though there is public support for many of the policies they espouse. The English Democrats gained just 64,826 votes in the 2010 UK general election, accounting for 0.3 per cent of all votes cast in England.

Public opinion
A 2007 poll of 1,953 people throughout Great Britain carried out for BBC Newsnight, found 61 per cent support among the English for a parliament of their own, with 51 per cent of Scots and 48 per cent of Welsh people favouring the same. An earlier ICM poll of 869 English people in November 2006 produced a slightly higher majority of 68 per cent backing the establishment of such a body.

A 2014 poll by Cardiff and Edinburgh universities found that 54% of English people surveyed agreed with a devolved parliament, while 20% neither agreed nor disagreed, 15% disagreed, and 10% were undecided.

Opinion polls
Polling data for English devolution, English votes for English laws and independence may be found in the table below.

Note: Responses with the plurality of the vote are outlined in bold and are coloured in, those with at least 50% of the vote have more saturated colours.

British Social Attitudes research 
The British Social Attitudes surveys have collated data on the question of English devolution since 1999, it has given participants three options.

Note: Responses with the plurality of the vote are outlined in bold and are coloured in, those with at least 50% of the vote have more saturated colours.

See also
 English nationalism
 English independence
 Asymmetric federalism

References

Citations

Sources

Further reading
 Devolution: A Decade on., Justice Select Committee, 12 May 2009

External links
  Ipsos MORI 2006 Poll - Views on English Devolution - 41% support English Parliament
 Campaign for an English Parliament
 Toque blog

Politics of England
Devolution in the United Kingdom
English nationalism
Proposed legislatures
England